The attorney general of New Mexico, an elected executive officer of the state, oversees the New Mexico Attorney General's Office and serves as head of the New Mexico Department of Justice.

The officeholder, who is required to be a licensed attorney, is fifth in succession to the office of Governor of New Mexico, after the Lieutenant Governor of New Mexico, Secretary of State of New Mexico, President pro tempore of the New Mexico Senate and the Speaker of New Mexico House of Representatives.

The attorney general of New Mexico functions as the state's chief legal officer, legal counsel to state government, consumer advocate and guardian of the public interest.

Statutory responsibilities 
The officeholder represents the state before any courts or agencies when the public interest requires or when requested by the Governor and prosecutes and defends all causes in the New Mexico Supreme Court, New Mexico Court of Appeals, or any other court or tribunal in which the state is a party or is interested. The New Mexico Attorney General prosecutes and defends all actions and proceedings involving any state employee in their official capacity, as well as may represent residential or small business consumers before the New Mexico Public Regulation Commission.

Upon request, the AG will provide written legal opinions to the legislature, any state official, or any district attorney on any subject pending before one of these officials.  In matters involving the state Election Code the AG provides legal assistance to the Secretary of State of New Mexico.

The AG drafts contracts, bonds, and other instruments as required for use by the state.

At the governor's direction, the AG may attend and assist in the trial of any indictment or information in any county of the state. When a District Attorney fails or refuses to act, the AG may act on behalf of a county in any criminal or civil case.

In matters of the impeachment of a state legislator or employee, the AG initiates conflict of interest enforcement actions.  The AG also prosecutes removal proceedings against district attorneys.

The AG establishes and maintains a register of all documents filed by charitable organizations and makes it available for public inspection.

List of New Mexico Attorneys General 
Parties

References

External links 
 New Mexico Attorney General official website
 New Mexico Attorney General articles at ABA Journal
 News and Commentary at FindLaw
 New Mexico Statutes at Law.Justia.com
 U.S. Supreme Court Opinions – "Cases with title containing: State of New Mexico" at FindLaw
 State Bar of New Mexico
 New Mexico Attorney General Hector Balderas profile at National Association of Attorneys General
 Press releases at New Mexico Attorney General

New Mexico Attorneys General